Rhys Lenarduzzi (born 3 August 1990) is a former Italy international rugby league footballer who played as a scrum-half for the Lézignan Sangliers in the Elite One Championship.

Background
His sister Chelsea Lenarduzzi plays for the Brisbane Broncos in the NRLW.

Rugby league
Lenarduzzi was an Italian international. 
He has previously played for Lezignan in the Elite One Championship. He has also been in the systems of the St. George Illawarra Dragons, Parramatta Eels and the Penrith Panthers. He played in the National Youth Competition for the Sydney Roosters.

Rugby union
Lenarduzzi later switched to rugby union, and played for Rugby Rovigo Delta in the 2012–13 European Challenge Cup.

References

External links
Aspire Management profile

1990 births
Living people
Italian rugby league players
Italian rugby union players
Italy national rugby league team players
Lézignan Sangliers players
Rugby league five-eighths
Rugby league fullbacks
Rugby league halfbacks
Rugby league hookers
Rugby Rovigo Delta players
Shellharbour City Dragons players